Agelasta villosipes is a species of beetle in the family Cerambycidae. It was described by Stephan von Breuning in 1939. It is known from Java.

References

villosipes
Beetles described in 1939